The House of Álvarez-Cuevas or House of Álvarez de Cuevas is a Spanish aristocratic family.

History 

The House of Álvarez-Cuevas has its origins in the Principality of Asturias, although its members soon settled in the Kingdom of Seville, where at the end of the 17th century, the family possessions were in Jerez de la Frontera, Rota and El Puerto de Santa María, the city where the Álvarez-Cuevas Palace is located.

After the War of the Spanish Succession (1701-1713) and the victory of Philip V of Spain, supported by the House of Álvarez-Cuevas, successive members of the family participated in the West Indies Fleet and occupied high military commands in Cádiz, Veracruz, La Habana and Cartagena de Indias, in the Spanish Navy. They also occupied different municipal offices in El Puerto de Santa María, where Francisco de Álvarez-Cuevas y Banquero became an illustrious native of the city.

In the 18th century, the senior line of the family was established in the Principality of Catalonia, when Juan de Álvarez-Cuevas y de Craywinckel married María Luisa de Viard y de Salvador, niece of the Count of Fogonella.

Throughout its history, the House of Alvarez-Cuevas has connected with important Spanish noble houses, having as ancestors the Barons of Florejachs, the Marquises of Serdañola, the Counts of Castellar and, with the latter, Juan Alonso Pérez de Guzmán, 1st Duke of Medina Sidonia.

Prominent members of the family 
Francisco de Álvarez-Cuevas y Pelayo (deceased in 1738), captain of the Spanish Navy. In 1731 he served in the Mediterranean Squadron, headed by Admiral Blas de Lezo, as captain of the ship of the line "San Carlos".
Francisco de Álvarez-Cuevas y Banquero (son of the previous person), perpetual alderman of El Puerto de Santa María (Cádiz).
Juan de Álvarez-Cuevas y Banquero (brother of the previous person), officer of the Spanish Navy in the Viceroyalty of New Granada.
Juan de Álvarez-Cuevas y de Craywinckel (1740), cavalry lieutenant colonel.
María Ramona de Álvarez-Cuevas y de Viard (1777-1857), 8th Marquise of Santa Cruz de Marcenado and 8th Viscountess of Puerto.
Manuel de Navia-Osorio y de Álvarez-Cuevas (1806-1881), 9th Marquis of Santa Cruz de Marcenado, deputy.
José María de Navia-Osorio y de Álvarez-Cuevas (1812), 9th Viscount of Puerto, brigadier, deputy and civil governor of Oviedo and Santander.
Antonio de Padua (1812-1889), Narciso (1812), Felipe (1814), Francisco and José (1817) de Álvarez-Cuevas y de Tord, knights of the Order of Isabella the Catholic and of the Royal and Military Order of Saint Ferdinand.
José de Álvarez-Cuevas y de Lacassaigne (deceased in 1929), deputy.
Juan de Álvarez-Cuevas y de Sisternes (1873-1936), mayor of Villafranca del Panadés (Barcelona) between 1925 and 1930.
Manuel de Álvarez-Cuevas y Olivella (1874-1930), deputy mayor of Barcelona City Council and President of the Organizing Committee of the 1929 Barcelona International Exposition.
María de las Mercedes de Álvarez-Cuevas y Güell (deceased in 1971), decorated with the Spanish Medal of Suffering for the Fatherland.

Properties 
Different members of the Álvarez-Cuevas family own or have owned several historic buildings in Catalonia:
Royal Palace of Villafranca del Panadés (Barcelona), current Catalan Wine Cultures Museum.
Maciá Palace in Villafranca del Panadés (Barcelona).
Penyafel Castle in Santa Margarita y Monjós (Barcelona).
Álvarez-Cuevas House in Santa Margarita y Monjós (Barcelona).
Maciá House in Santa Margarita y Monjós (Barcelona). 
Perelló House in Ametlla (Lérida).

References 

Alvarez-Cuevas